Sarkar Talwar (born 22 September 1952) is an Indian former cricketer who played first class cricket for Haryana as a right-arm offbreak bowler between 1967–68 and 1987–88.

Sh. Sarkar Talwar, Director- Sports, Manav Rachna Educational Institutions has been conferred upon with the Dronacharya Lifetime Award by the honourable President of India.

External links
 

1952 births
Living people
Haryana cricketers
North Zone cricketers
Southern Punjab cricketers
Punjab, India cricketers
Indian cricketers
Sportspeople from Agra